Devika Nambiar is an Indian actress and television presenter who appears in Malayalam television and films, along with a few Tamil films.

Filmography

Films

Television

Special appearances

Webseries

Music videos

References

External links

Living people
Malayali people
Actresses from Kerala
Indian soap opera actresses
21st-century Indian actresses
Actresses in Malayalam television
Actresses in Tamil cinema
Year of birth missing (living people)
Actresses in Malayalam cinema